The 1938–39 Ranji Trophy was the fifth season of the Ranji Trophy. Nineteen teams took part in four zones in a knockout format. Bengal won their first title defeating Southern Punjab in the final.

Highlights
 Tom Longfield was the second non-native captain to win Ranji trophy, after Bert Wensley in 1936–37
 Naoomal Jeoomal of Sind scored 203* against Nawanagar out of a score of only 326.
 In the Nawanagar v Western India match, Amar Singh became the first bowler to take 100 Ranji Trophy wickets. This was his 14th Ranji Trophy match.

Zonal Matches

West Zone

North Zone

South Zone

East Zone

Inter-Zonal Knockout Stage

Final

Scorecards and averages
Cricketarchive

References

External links

1939 in Indian cricket
Indian domestic cricket competitions